Redigobius dewaali, the Checked goby, is a species of goby native to the Indian Ocean coast of Africa from Mozambique and South Africa. This species inhabits fresh and brackish waters of estuaries, lakes and floodplain pans where there is plentiful vegetation. It can reach a length of  SL.

References

Redigobius
Taxonomy articles created by Polbot
Fish described in 1897